This list comprises all players who have participated in at least one league match for Yakima Reds in the USL Premier Development League since the USL began keeping detailed records in 2003. Players who were on the roster but never played a first team game are not listed; players who appeared for the team in other competitions (US Open Cup, etc.) but never actually made an USL appearance are noted at the bottom of the page where appropriate.

A
  Byron Alvarez 
  Albert Anabtawi
  Andres Atencio
  Christian Atencio
  Jared Auckland
  Jordan Auckland
  Cesar Oliver Avila
  Brett Axelrod

B
  Michael Babenko
  Eder Barajas-Partida
  Craig Buitrago

C
  Julio Cesar Cabrera
  Victor Calderon-Castro
  Jason Cascio
  Mike Chabala
  Mark Cox
  Derek Crismier

D
  Ryan Delo

E
  Kevin Eggen
  Hans Esterhuizen
  Chris Eylander

F
  Guadalupe Farias
  Tyson Farley
  Elliott Fauske
  Danny Ferris
  Matt Fischer
  Eric Forner
  Kyle Foster
  Eric Franco-Cobaleda

G
  Kevin Galioto
  Luis Galvan
  Miguel Galvan
  Luis Gamez
  José García
  Joseph Gibson
  Junior Garcia
  Andrew Giron
  Geoff Goodwill

H
  Joshua Hacker
  Matthew Hennessey
  German Hernandez
  Chris Hodges

J
  Wyatt Jonstone

L
  Jeff Lane
  Humberto Lopez
  Jorge Lopez
  Angel Lopez-Ayala

M
  Luiz Marcelo Machado
  Nicholas Malmstrom
  Mazin Mansoor
  Adam Mariani
  Nishijyo Masaki
  Bobby McAllister 
  Robert McCurdy
  Andrew McDonald
  Freddie Mejia
  Justin Merrell
  Cameron Mertens
  Colin Mertens
  Andrew Mobley
  Peter Mullenbach
  Kevin Murray
  Oliver McCoy

N
  Alvaro Navarro
  Bryan Neal
  John Neubauer
  Aaron Nistrian
  Aaron Nonnemacher

O
  Andrew O'Brien
  Vinicius Oliveira
  John Oliver

P
  Jason Pele
  Tyler Penn
  Jason Pete
  Perry Piercy
  Daniel Pulse
  Greg Pfleger

R
  Jacob Rhoads
  Jose Rivera
  Santa Maria Rivera-Valdovinos
  Tyler Roberts
  Christian Rodriguez
  Derek Rogalsky
  Alonso Rojas
  Raymundo Rojas

S
  Jake Sagare
  Mauricio Sanchez
  Jose Santana
  Anthony Sardon
  Christopher Sardon
  Daniel Saucedo
  Mikel Schafer
  John Schefter
  Wyatt Seddon-Johnston
  Jose Serna-Rivera
  Tao Shen
  Roberto Silva
  Hank Stebbins
  Dennis Stevenson
  Brad Suhm
  Tyler Suhm
  Joseph Supang

T
  Bobak Talebi
  Jason Timm
  Edgar Torres
  Jordan Troutt

V
  Alvaro Valencia
  Hector Vega Jr.
  Juan Viveros

W
  Ian Walsh
  Danny Waltman
  Travis Wright

Y
  David Yanez

Sources

Yakima Reds
 
Association football player non-biographical articles